Fishley is a village in the English county of Norfolk, forming part of the civil parish of Upton with Fishley.

History
In the Domesday Book, Fishley is listed as a settlement of 34 households located in the hundred of Walsham. In 1086, the village was divided between the East Anglian estates of King William I, St Benet's Abbey and William d'Ecouis.

Fishley Hall was built as a manor-house in the Eighteenth Century and features ornate Georgian gardens and an approach drive. The hall was derelict by 1999 but is today fully restored and operates as a venue of wedding receptions.

Geography
Fishley falls within the constituency of Broadland and is represented at Parliament by Jerome Mayhew MP of the Conservative Party. For the purposes of local government, the parish falls within the district of Broadland.

St. Mary's Church
Fishley's church is dedicated to Saint Mary and is one of Norfolk's 124 remaining Anglo-Saxon round-tower churches. St. Mary's was heavily restored in the Nineteenth Century.

External links

St Mary's on the European Round Tower Churches Website
Round Tower Churches Society, more general information on the history of the round-tower churches.

References

Villages in Norfolk
Broadland